Brian Howes, also known as Howes, is a Canadian songwriter and record producer.

Career
Howes played in a British Columbia band, Young Gun, and later fronted the group DDT which blended punk, ska, and rap. The band was signed to Metallica drummer Lars Ulrich's label The Music Company, through Elektra Records, in the late 1990s. DDT's Urban Observer album was supported by the first single "Walkabout".

With Brian Jennings, Axel G and Robin Diaz, Howes formed the alternative rock band Closure in 2002 in Vancouver and signed to TVT Records. They released a self-titled album in 2003 and their single, "Look Out Below", was included in the soundtrack of the 2003 film Darkness Falls. The group was dropped by the label and disbanded in 2006.

Howes went on to become a producer. He produced, engineered and co-wrote Hinder's debut album, Extreme Behavior. He also produced and helped write Skillet's 2006 album, Comatose.  In 2007 he was named Producer of the Year at the Juno Awards.

In 2013 he was given a plaque on the Comox Valley Walk of Achievement.

Awards
SOCAN's International Achievement Award in 2010
2007 and 2012 JUNO Award for Producer of the Year for his work on Hedley and Nickelback. 
Nominated for Producer of the Year in 2010 and 2014.
2008 BMI Pop Awards, including top honor Song of the Year, as well as Top Digital Song for "Lips of an Angel"
Won three additional BMI Pop Awards in 2009 for work with Daughtry and Skillet
Won BMI award for "Light On" (David Cook) in 2009
Won several SOCAN awards for various projects, including the Pop Rock Award in 2012
Nominated for a Grammy (Skillet) in 2008
Dove Award for his work on Skillet's Comatose

Discography

Producer

References

External links

Closure's MySpace Page

Place of birth missing (living people)
Living people
Canadian male singers
Canadian rock singers
Canadian record producers
Musicians from British Columbia
1965 births
Jack Richardson Producer of the Year Award winners